Fred Wilcox (23 October 1922 – 22 January 2015) was an English footballer, who played as a full back in the Football League for Chester.

References

1922 births
2015 deaths
Association football fullbacks
Chester City F.C. players
English Football League players
English footballers
Everton F.C. players
Footballers from St Helens, Merseyside
South Liverpool F.C. players